Sherkat-e Nikan Namak (also Romanized as Sherḵat-e Nīḵān Namaḵ) is a village in Eyvanki Rural District, Eyvanki District, Garmsar County, Semnan Province, Iran. At the 2006 census, its population was 30, in 7 families.

References 

Populated places in Garmsar County